Avilin Pradip Ghosh (born 21 September 1990) is an Indian cricketer. He played two Twenty20 matches for Bengal in 2014. In August 2014, Ghosh was named as a probable for Bengal's team for the 2014–15 Ranji Trophy. Although he did not play in the Ranji Trophy, he made his Twenty20 debut for Bengal in the 2014–15 Syed Mushtaq Ali Trophy on 11 April 2014.

See also
 List of Bengal cricketers

References

External links
 

1990 births
Living people
Indian cricketers
Bengal cricketers
Cricketers from Kolkata